Naidoo is a surname. It is an alternative spelling of Naidu. Notable people with the surname include:

Ama Naidoo (1908–1993), South African anti-apartheid activist
Anand Naidoo, South African television anchor
Beverley Naidoo, South African children's author 
Euvin Naidoo, South African businessman
Indira Naidoo (born 1968), Australian author
Indira Naidoo-Harris, South African-born Canadian politician
Jay Naidoo (born 1954), South African trade unionist
Kesivan Naidoo (born 1979), South African drummer
Kimeshan Naidoo (born 1991), South African entrepreneur and engineer
Kumi Naidoo (born 1965), South African human rights activist
Leigh-Ann Naidoo (born 1976), South African beach volleyball player
Vassi Naidoo (born 1955), South African businessman
Naransamy Roy Naidoo (1901–1953), South African activist
Ravi Naidoo, South African designer
Shanti Naidoo, South African anti-apartheid activist
Shashi Naidoo (born 1980), South African actress
Stephen Naidoo (1937–1989), South African Roman Catholic archbishop
Thambi Naidoo, South African politician
Xavier Naidoo (born 1971), German singer

References